Georges André Weingand (14 March 1915 – 6 March 2004) was a French gymnast. He competed at the 1948 Summer Olympics and the 1952 Summer Olympics.

References

External links
 

1915 births
2004 deaths
French male artistic gymnasts
Olympic gymnasts of France
Gymnasts at the 1948 Summer Olympics
Gymnasts at the 1952 Summer Olympics
People from Luxeuil-les-Bains
Sportspeople from Haute-Saône
20th-century French people